Bård Tønder (born 1 May 1948) is a Norwegian judge.

He was born in Sjøvegan, and graduated as cand.jur. in 1975. He worked in the Ministry of Justice and the Police from 1976 to 1978, as an attorney in Trondenes from 1971 to 1981, in the Office of the Attorney General of Norway from 1985 and as a Supreme Court Justice from 2006 to his retirement at age 70.

References

1948 births
Living people
People from Salangen
Supreme Court of Norway justices
Norwegian civil servants
20th-century Norwegian lawyers
21st-century Norwegian lawyers